The 2013–14 season of Panathinaikos B.C. was the 51st season of the basketball club in the highest division of Greek basketball. The team won the Greek Basket League this season, along with the Greek Cup. In the Euroleague they were Quarter-finalists.

Roster

}

}

}

References

2013–14
2013–14 in Greek basketball by club
Panathinaikos